Frea basalis is a species of beetle in the family Cerambycidae. It was described by Karl Jordan in 1894. It is known from Cameroon, Angola, and the Democratic Republic of the Congo.

Varieties
 Frea basalis var. fasciolata (Hintz, 1912)
 Frea basalis var. griseobasalis Breuning, 1942
 Frea basalis var. thoracica (Hintz, 1912)
 Frea basalis var. uniformis (Hintz, 1912)

References

basalis
Beetles described in 1894